Lamaze most commonly refers to the Lamaze technique of natural childbirth

Lamaze can also refer to:

 Lamaze Infant Development System, a line of baby toys

People with the surname Lamaze
Fernand Lamaze (1891–1957), French physician who invented the Lamaze technique
Eric Lamaze (born 1968), Canadian showjumper